An Evening with George Shearing & Mel Tormé is a live album by Mel Tormé, accompanied by George Shearing.

It was the first of six albums that Tormé and Shearing recorded together for Concord Records, and Tormé's performance on this album won him the Grammy Award for Best Jazz Vocal Performance, Male at the 25th Grammy Awards.

Track listing
 "All God's Chillun Got Rhythm" (Walter Jurmann, Gus Kahn, Bronisław Kaper) – 3:37
 "Born to Be Blue" (Mel Tormé, Bob Wells) – 5:15
 "Give Me the Simple Life" (Rube Bloom, Harry Ruby) – 3:39
 "Good Morning Heartache" (Dan Fisher, Ervin Drake, Irene Higginbotham) – 6:10
 "Manhattan Hoedown" (Brian Torff) – 4:46
 "You'd Be So Nice to Come Home To" (Cole Porter) – 2:52
 "A Nightingale Sang in Berkeley Square" (Eric Maschwitz, Manning Sherwin) – 5:02
 "Love" (Ralph Blane, Hugh Martin) – 4:55
 "It Might as Well Be Spring" (Oscar Hammerstein II, Richard Rodgers) – 4:42
 "Lullaby of Birdland" (George Shearing, George David Weiss) – 7:32

Personnel 
 Mel Tormé – vocals
 George Shearing – piano
 Brian Torff – double bass

References

Mel Tormé live albums
George Shearing live albums
1982 live albums
Concord Records live albums
Albums produced by Carl Jefferson
Grammy Award for Best Jazz Vocal Performance, Male